Trypanosoma congolense is a species of trypanosomes and is the major pathogen responsible for the disease nagana in cattle and other animals including sheep, pigs, goats, horses and camels, dogs, as well as laboratory mice. It is the most common cause of nagana in east Africa, but is also a major cause of nagana in west Africa. This parasite is spread by tsetse flies. In its mammalian host, Trypanosoma congolense only lives in blood vessels, and causes in particular anaemia.

Infection process 
T. congolense causes anemia. Nok et al 2003 find T. congolense to alter the surfaces of erythrocytes which may contribute to this effect.

Drug resistance 
Individuals isolated from Boran cattle in the Gibe River Valley in southwest Ethiopia showed universal resistance between July 1989 and February 1993. This likely indicates a permanent loss of function in this area for the tested trypanocides, Diminazene aceturate, Isometamidium chloride, and Homidium chloride.

References

External link

Trypanosomatida
Parasites of equines
Parasites of mammals
Articles containing video clips